Sergeant John Carmichael  (1 April 1893 – 20 December 1977) was a British Army soldier and a Scottish recipient of the Victoria Cross (VC), the highest and most prestigious award for gallantry in the face of the enemy that can be awarded to British and Commonwealth forces.

Carmichael was 24 years old, and a sergeant in the 9th Battalion, The North Staffordshire Regiment (The Prince of Wales's), during the First World War when the following deed took place for which he was awarded the Victoria Cross. 

On 8 September 1917, when excavating a trench near Hill 60, Zwarteleen, Belgium, Sergeant Carmichael saw that a grenade had been unearthed and had started to burn. Rather than simply throwing the bomb out of the trench and endangering the lives of the men working on top, he immediately rushed to the spot shouting for his men to get clear, put his steel helmet over the grenade and then stood on the helmet. The grenade exploded, blowing him out of the trench causing him serious injuries, but no one else was hurt. He could not walk for 3 years.

Freemasonry
He was initiated into Freemasonry in Lodge New Monkland, No. 88, (Airdrie, Scotland) on 9 January, Passed on 23 January and Raised on 27 March 1919.

The Medal
His VC is displayed at the Staffordshire Regiment Museum, Whittington Barracks, Lichfield, Staffordshire.

References

Monuments to Courage (David Harvey, 1999)
The Register of the Victoria Cross (This England, 1997)
The Sapper VCs (Gerald Napier, 1998)
Scotland's Forgotten Valour (Graham Ross, 1995)
VCs of the First World War - Passchendaele 1917 (Stephen Snelling, 1998)

External links
Location of grave and VC medal (Strathclyde)
John Carmichael, V.C.(cemetery & photo)

1893 births
1977 deaths
People from North Lanarkshire
British World War I recipients of the Victoria Cross
British Army personnel of World War I
North Staffordshire Regiment soldiers
Recipients of the Military Medal
Royal Engineers soldiers
Sherwood Foresters soldiers
British Army recipients of the Victoria Cross
Military personnel from Lanarkshire
Burials in Scotland